Skala is the second studio album by Norwegian jazz musician Mathias Eick.

Reception
Brent Burton of JazzTimes stated "Is Skala a jazz record? The guy who made it, Mathias Eick, is certainly a jazz musician. The Norwegian trumpeter, age 31, improvises all over Vespers, the glacially paced new album from the Iro Haarla Quintet. But on Skala, his second (and most scripted) album as a leader, Eick largely sticks to melodies and motifs. His devotion to composition, coupled with drummer Gard Nilssen’s tendency to play in bouncy 4/4, means that, at times, Skala behaves less like modern jazz than it does horn-laden pop." John Kelman of All About Jazz wrote "In the context of his own work, he continues to favor substance over style, and while the music of Skala is even more structured than that on The Door, when Eick does solo, it's with an economical precision that weaves through grooves and changes with equal aplomb." Ray Comiskey of The Irish Times added "Eick is a beautiful, imaginative musician with a very Scandinavian sense of transience informing his melodic charm... But there’s not much blood in Skala, despite the sweat."

Track listing

Personnel
Mathias Eick – trumpet
Andreas Ulvo – piano
Audun Erlien – electric bass
Torstein Lofthus – drums
Gard Nilssen – drums
Morten Qvenild – keyboards
Tore Brunborg – tenor saxophone
Sidsel Walstad – harp

References

ECM Records albums
2011 albums
Albums produced by Manfred Eicher